Luis Alberto Islas Ranieri (born 22 December 1965 in Buenos Aires, Argentina) is an Argentine former football goalkeeper. He played for the Argentina national team, Independiente, Estudiantes de La Plata and León.

Playing career

Club
Islas started his career as a goalkeeper in Chacarita Juniors in the early 1980s. He earned his nickname el loco ("crazy") because of his flair and temperament.

In late 1982 Islas was transferred to Estudiantes. There, he alternated with Carlos Bertero in the team that won the Nacional championship title in 1983.

He was transferred to Independiente in 1986 and played for two years. He then went to Atlético Madrid in 1988 but did not play a game and was loaned to CD Logroñés. He came back to Independiente in 1990 and helped the team win the Clausura 1994 and two international titles.

He retired in 2003 after playing 241 games for Independiente.

International
Islas was part of Argentina's Youth Football Team that finished runner-up at the 1983 FIFA World Youth Championship.

Islas was the substitute goalkeeper during the 1986 World Cup, which Argentina won. Angry that he was still a substitute for Nery Pumpido, he resigned the national team just before the 1990 World Cup. Pumpido was injured in the second match during that cup, so third goalkeeper Sergio Goycochea was put to the fore, and was selected the best goalkeeper of the tournament. After the cup, Islas returned to the national team under new coach Alfio Basile. Because Goycochea had some weak matches during the qualifiers to the 1994 World Cup, Islas was the starting goalkeeper for Argentina during the 1994 World Cup.

Managerial career
After a stint in Bolivia, Islas managed Argentine side Club Almagro from November 2006 to May 2007, after it Islas has returned to Bolivia to manage Aurora but resigned in September 2007.

Career statistics

Honours
Estudiantes
Argentine Primera División: Nacional 1983

Independiente
Argentine Primera División: Clausura 1994
Supercopa Sudamericana: 1994
Recopa Sudamericana: 1995

Argentina
FIFA World Cup: 1986
Confederations Cup: 1992
Copa América: 1991, 1993
Artemio Franchi Cup: 1993

Individual
FIFA World Youth Championship: Bronze ball 1983
Olimpia Award: 1992

References

1965 births
Living people
Footballers from Buenos Aires
Argentine people of Italian descent
Argentine people of Spanish descent
Argentine footballers
Association football goalkeepers
Chacarita Juniors footballers
Estudiantes de La Plata footballers
Club Atlético Independiente footballers
Newell's Old Boys footballers
Club Atlético Platense footballers
Deportivo Toluca F.C. players
Club León footballers
Club Atlético Huracán footballers
Club Atlético Tigre footballers
Talleres de Córdoba footballers
La Liga players
CD Logroñés footballers
1986 FIFA World Cup players
1994 FIFA World Cup players
1992 King Fahd Cup players
1987 Copa América players
1989 Copa América players
1993 Copa América players
FIFA World Cup-winning players
FIFA Confederations Cup-winning players
Copa América-winning players
Argentina youth international footballers
Argentina under-20 international footballers
Argentina international footballers
Footballers at the 1988 Summer Olympics
Olympic footballers of Argentina
Argentine football managers
Club Aurora managers
Almagro managers
Argentine Primera División players
Liga MX players
Argentine expatriate footballers
Expatriate footballers in Mexico
Expatriate footballers in Spain
Argentine expatriate sportspeople in Mexico
Argentine expatriate sportspeople in Spain
Club Sol de América managers